Kraj (in Macedonian Cyrillic: Крај, English translation: End) is 2009 single by the Macedonian pop princess Karolina Gočeva.

Production history
The author of the music for this song is the famous Serbian hip hop artist Sky Wikluh. The song is realized in two versions: Macedonian & Serbian. The author of the Serbian lyrics is Sky Wikluh respectively and of the Macedonian Vesna Malinova.

Music video
In mid-June 2009, Karolina shot a video for this song with the Macedonian video production "Tomato". In the video she is showing herself in a new edition. She has a lot of sexappeal, during her soiling in the water. The video had its official showing on the 5 of July 2009.

References

Macedonian songs
2009 songs